Vidas Markevičius (25 August 1963 – October 1992) was a Lithuanian boxer. He competed in the men's heavyweight event at the 1992 Summer Olympics.

References

1963 births
1992 deaths
Lithuanian male boxers
Olympic boxers of Lithuania
Boxers at the 1992 Summer Olympics
Sportspeople from Kaunas
Heavyweight boxers